Epinotia exquisitana is a species of moth of the family Tortricidae. It is found in China, Korea, Japan and Russia.

The wingspan is 16–19 mm.

The larvae feed on Malus manshurica, Malus sachalinensis, Cerasus maximowiczii, Cerasus kurilensis, Cerasus sachalinensis, Sorbus commixta and Padus ssiori.

References

Moths described in 1882
Eucosmini